John McCullough Adam (6 November 1875–24 January 1946) was a British sailing competitor at the 1908 Summer Olympics.

He was a crew member on the Mouchette which finished second of two teams competing in the 12 metre class. At the time, only the helmsman and mate were awarded silver medals, while the crew received bronze medals. However, Adam is credited as having received a silver medal in the official Olympic database.

References

External links
 

1875 births
1946 deaths
People from Gourock
British male sailors (sport)
Olympic sailors of Great Britain
Olympic silver medallists for Great Britain
Olympic medalists in sailing
Medalists at the 1908 Summer Olympics
Sailors at the 1908 Summer Olympics – 12 Metre